Petitot is a river in northern Alberta and British Columbia, Canada. It is a tributary of the Liard River.

Petitot River originates from Bistcho Lake in northwestern Alberta, and flows westwards along the northern borders of Alberta and British Columbia. It then passes in the Northwest Territories, where it discharges in the Liard River at the village of Fort Liard. From there, its waters are carried to the Arctic Ocean through the Mackenzie River.

The river takes its name from Father Émile Petitot, one of the first European to reach the area in 1867–68.

Tributaries
Thinahtea Lake Creek
July Lake Creek
Sahdoanah Creek
Thetlaandoa Creek
Tsea River
Dilly Creek
D'Easum Creek

See also
List of rivers of Alberta
List of rivers of British Columbia

References

Rivers of British Columbia
Rivers of Alberta
Fort Nelson Country
Canyons and gorges of Canada
Tributaries of the Liard River